Fast Money is an American financial stock trading talk show that began airing on the CNBC cable/satellite TV channel on June 21, 2006. Beginning October 10, 2007, it was broadcast every weeknight at 5pm ET, one hour after the close of trading on the New York Stock Exchange, until mid-2011 when it was moved to just four nights per week, Monday through Thursday, to make room for special option and currency trading shows on Friday evenings. On March 22, 2013, it returned to the Friday night slot as a half-hour show, followed by the Options Action half-hour show. The show originates from the NASDAQ MarketSite in New York City.

Program format
Melissa Lee anchors a fast-paced discussion among four professional Wall Street traders. The group discusses various investment strategies, including technical analysis, and debate the merits of each other's arguments for or against a particular stock or sector. The show covers topics such as options trading, commodities, and exchange-traded funds.

Most episodes feature regularly appearing traders: Guy Adami, Bonawyn Eison, Karen Finerman, Steve Grasso, Brian Kelly, Mike Khouw, Pete Najarian, Dan Nathan, Tim Seymour, and Nadine Terman.

History
The success of Mad Money prompted CNBC to look to replicate that success with another show.  Fast Money was created by Dylan Ratigan and Susan Krakower, Vice President of Strategic Programming and Development, as a spin off from a weekly segment that first aired in the May 2006 episodes of On the Money.   The show originally aired from CNBC headquarters in Englewood Cliffs, New Jersey, with Ratigan as host, and a regular panel of Jeff Macke, Guy Adami, Tim Strazzini, and Eric Bolling. By January 8, 2007, it became a weekday show with its studio at the NASDAQ MarketSite.

On Fridays, beginning with March 5, 2010, the show was truncated to just 30 minutes as Options Action (also hosted by Melissa Lee) was aired in the 5:30 ET timeslot.  Both Fast Money and Options Action are broadcast from the NASDAQ MarketSite.

In mid-2011, Fast Money was removed from the Friday night line-up altogether to make room for Money in Motion: Currency Trading (also hosted by Melissa Lee) which airs in the 5:30 ET time slot, while Options Action was moved up a half-hour to 5pm ET. On March 22, 2013, it returned to the Friday night lineup. The program airs the first half hour (5pm ET) followed by half hour of Options Action at 5:30pm ET. Money in Motion was removed from the CNBC lineup

On October 13, 2014, Fast Money, along with CNBC's other business-day programs, were launched in full 1080i high-definition as part of a network-wide switch to a full 16:9 presentation.

Panelist changes
Strazzini was replaced by Najarian on May 18, 2007.  Bolling was replaced by Finerman on September 4, 2007. Seymour, who had appeared on the show as a substitute panelist, was made a regular in October 2008.  After published rumors of conflict with Fast Money co-creator Susan Krakower, Ratigan left the network on March 27, 2009 when his CNBC contract expired.  Ratigan was replaced by Lee, who sometimes filled in for Ratigan.  Macke left CNBC on June 15, 2009

Hosts

Current
Melissa Lee ("The Emissary"; became permanent host in April 2009)

Former
Dylan Ratigan ("The Commissioner"; 2006–2009)
Erin Burnett ("The Heiress")+, now with CNN
Matt Nesto ("The House")+
Michelle Caruso-Cabrera ("La Princesa")+
Melissa Francis ("The Empress")+, now with the Fox Business Network
Simon Hobbs ("Simon Bar Sinister")+
Amanda Drury+
Becky Quick ("The Contessa")+
Tim Strazzini ("The Risk Doctor"; 2006–2009)
+ fill-ins

Panelists

Current
Guy Adami ("The Negotiator"; 2006–present)
Bonawyn Eison (2019–present)
Karen Finerman ("The Chairwoman"; 2007–present)
Steve Grasso ("The Governor"; 2009–present)
Brian Kelly (“BK”; 2009–present)
Mike Khouw ("The Professor"; 2009–present), also on Options Action
Pete Najarian ("The Pit Boss"; 2007–present)
Dan Nathan (2011–present)
Tim Seymour ("The Ambassador"; 2007–present)
Nadine Terman (2021–present)
Carter Worth ("The Chart Master"; 2007–present), also on Options Action
Tony Zhang (2019–present), also on Options Action

Former
Eric Bolling ("The Admiral"; 2006–2007), former host of The Five on Fox News Channel
Stacey Briere-Gilbert ("The Hammer"; 2007)
Steve Cortes ("El Capitan"; 2009–before 2013)
Dennis Gartman (2008–present)
Zachary Karabell ("The Academic"; 2008–before 2013)
Joe "JJ" Kinahan (2008–before 2013)
Jared A Levy ("The Strategist"; 2009–before 2013)
Jeff Macke ("The Lone Wolf"; 2006–2009)
David B. Seaburg
Tim Strazzini ("The Risk Doctor"; 2006–2007)
Brian Stutland
Joe Terranova ("The Liquidator"; 2008)
Quint Tatro ("The Kentucky Kid")

Segments

The show has several distinct segments, including (but not limited to):

 Page Two: An in-depth discussion of some of the main business related stories of the day.
 Chart of the Day: This segment highlights a chart that corresponds to the day's specific stock.
 Trade Tomorrow: Lee and her panel zero in on the next day's/week's top three trades than can make you money.
 The Takedown: When one panelist disagrees with the other over a certain issue or comment.
 Trade School: If a member of the panel uses Wall Street jargon, Lee will decipher it for viewers (with an accompanying definition).
 Word On The Street: "Best money making chatter behind the scenes"; involves in depth discussion on the various stocks that have made recent news.
 Street Fight: CNBC contributor, Herb Greenberg, takes on the 4 panelists and challenges one of the stock picks each panelist has recommended, Ratigan (and now Melissa Lee) picks a winner after each "fight" by siding with the views of the panelist or Herb Greenberg.
 Chartology: This segment looks at a chart that corresponds to a specific index, along with technical analysis, usually from Fast Money panelist Carter Worth.
 Breaking News: Late-breaking business headlines (seen on live broadcast only).
 Pops & Drops: Lee and her panelists review stocks that have the big gains (pops) and drops during the day (or week).
 Fast Fire: Panelists are held accountable for their past bad picks and are confronted on-air.  This segment is seen on Fridays.
 Stocks on Sale: Panelists asked Ratigan (the original host) whether or not a stock that is mentioned is on sale (very similar to the Lightning Round on Mad Money).  This segment is no longer current.
 Sector Trade: A segment in which the traders pull the curtain on a hot stock, and tells viewers how to play it.
 Happy 52-Week High: Seen before and after the commercial break, this segment was about a stock that has just hit a new 52-week high on that day, along with a trivia question and facts about that particular stock.  The answer to the question was revealed after the commercial break.  This segment was discontinued in January 2008 and replaced by the Trader Radar (see below).
 Trader Radar: A successor to the Happy 52-Week High segment (and is similar to the one mentioned above), this segment is about a stock that "lit up Wall Street radar screens everywhere" on that day.  The answer to the question is revealed after the commercial break.
 Take Your Position: The panelists give their specific thoughts related to an event, like a takeover or upcoming earnings.
 Face 2 Face: A viewer, via Webcam, asks a question about a specific stock to Lee and her panel.
 Grade the Trade: In this Friday segment (discontinued since October 2007), which involved college students who joined the show via Webcam, they had 30 seconds to answer a question asked by Ratigan.  The panelists then graded his/her trade.
 Trade Update: One of the panelists will give an update to a previous trade they had recommended.
 Fast Money World: Fast Money panelist Tim Seymour reveals some international stock trades.
 Fast Message: Lee reads viewer Emails
 Surprise Friday Guest: In this segment seen each Friday, a surprise guest joins the panel.
 Fast & Furious: A Pardon the Interruption-style rundown of events happening the next day. The idea for the segment was pitched by former CNBC intern Jason Parks in May 2008.
 Final Trade: The final segment of the show in which Lee and her panel reveal what your first move should be the next morning.

Programming and ratings

Fast Money's first 13 episodes (including one live audience broadcast) aired during the summer of 2006 in the Wednesday 8pm ET timeslot.  Ratings were relatively low, with the program averaging a bit over 110,000 viewers per week.  During the week of 2006-09-18, the program tried a new timeslot at 5pm ET, the plush timeslot with highly rated Closing Bell serving as the lead-out (bumping Kudlow & Company to 8pm for the week).  Here the show flourished, nearly doubling its viewership average to 211,000 viewers (on-par with what K&C normally gets). The 5pm ET timeslot, while successful, bumped Kudlow & Company to 8pm.  This brought the show's ratings down substantially compared to where they were before the temporary move. After its successful 5pm test run during the week of 2006-09-18, CNBC retried the program again at 8pm the week after. CNBC had hoped it may have gained some traction after the increased viewership from the week prior.  The show did not.  Ratings were roughly on-par with the summer 2006 airings.

Production

Fast Money broadcasts live weekdays at 5p ET from Times Square New York, New York, second-floor studios of the NASDAQ by CNBC, a national cable television network owned by NBC Universal/Comcast.

As of January 2009, among the many contributors are producer Jason Farkas, and tape producers Heather Wilcox and Boaz Halaban, responsible for creating and delivering the final show to air, after creating special Avid Adrenaline edited elements by CNBC Staff Avid Editors such as Conrad deVroeg, Gary Princz, Diana Constantino, and Dave Lettieri, and constructing the show with CNBC Staff Grass Valley NewsEdit Editors Rich Uliasz, Cosimo Camporeale, Carolyn Shivey, Vanessa DiPietro, Keri Conjura, Diana Acosta, and Kelly Frisco.

Special editions

Dow drops 416
On 2007-02-27, a special edition of Fast Money, which covered that day's 416-point plunge on the Dow Jones Industrial Average, aired.  It was rebroadcast at 1am ET, pre-empting that night's scheduled airing of The Big Idea with Donny Deutsch.

Wall Street's Worst Week since September 2002
On 2007-03-02, another special edition of Fast Money aired.  This time, it was a look back at Wall Street's worst week in nearly 4½ years.  Erin Burnett was the guest moderator of that episode (Dylan Ratigan was on assignment in Washington, DC when it aired).

Fast Money: Live from Silicon Valley
On 2007-10-19, Fast Money was broadcast live from the Computer History Museum in Mountain View, CA.  This special edition also covered that day's 367-point plunge on the Dow, which coincidentally, occurred 20 years to the day it lost 508 points, or 22.6% of its value on Black Monday.

Fast Money 1st Anniversary
The Fast Money 1st Anniversary special was broadcast on 2008-01-15.  This special edition showed memorable clips from its first year on the air from the NASDAQ (where Fast Money re-debuted on 2007-01-08), and also covered that day's 277-point plunge on the Dow.  Michael Eisner, former Disney CEO and current host of his own CNBC show, Conversations with Michael Eisner, made a special guest appearance on this program.

Fast Money: Miami Advice
On 2008-02-29, Fast Money was broadcast live from Coral Gables, Florida, a suburb of Miami.  This special edition also covered that day's 315-point plunge on the Dow.  Jack Welch, former Chairman and CEO of General Electric (the parent company of CNBC) and retiring NBA star Alonzo Mourning made special guest appearances on this program, which was also the first Fast Money to be filmed outdoors.

Fast Money: Trading Chicago Hope
The third Fast Money road show was broadcast live from the Cadillac Palace Theatre in Chicago on 2008-05-16.  Making special guest appearances in this edition were CME Chairman Terry Duffy, personal finance guru Suze Orman (host of CNBC's The Suze Orman Show) and Playboy Enterprises CEO Christie Hefner.

Fast Money Now
These special half-hour editions of Fast Money were aired at 1pm ET during the 2008 Summer Olympics over two weeks, from 2008-08-11 to 2008-08-22.  Due to CNBC's Olympics coverage, Fast Money Now (1pm ET) and Mad Money at the Half (1:30pm ET) were shown in place of the second hour of Power Lunch, while the hour-long editions of Fast Money (seen on a same-day tape delay) aired at 9pm ET.

Fast Money: Future of Wall Street
This special edition of Fast Money, which was broadcast from New York 2008-09-19 in front of a live audience, featured a guest appearance from activist investor Carl Icahn. This show was filmed in the Jazz at Lincoln Center—Allen Room.  This show also covered that day's 369-point gain on the Dow.

Fast Money: Washington - The Way Forward
This edition of the Fast Money road show was broadcast live from the DAR Constitution Hall in Washington, D.C. on 2008-11-07.  Guests included Keith Hennessey, assistant to the President for economic policy and Richard Brown, Federal Deposit Insurance Corporation chief economist.  The panel included five members with Tim Seymour joining the regular crew.

Fast Money Tenth Anniversary
For the week of 2017-01-09, the tenth-anniversary editions of Fast Money were broadcast live from the NASDAQ MarketSite in New York.

Fast Money MBA Challenge

Students from the top business schools across America competed in the Fast Money MBA Challenge, which was also hosted by Dylan Ratigan.  The shows were recorded at CNBC Global Headquarters in Englewood Cliffs, New Jersey, on 2007-07-14 and 2007-07-15.  Fast Money MBA Challenge aired on 2007-08-01, 2007-08-08, 2007-08-15, and 2007-08-22, and were repeated on the following Sunday at 9PM and 12AM Eastern Time from 2007-08-05 through 2007-08-26.

Participating schools:

 UCLA Anderson School of Management
 Columbia Business School
 MIT Sloan School of Management
 Yale School of Management
 New York University Stern School of Business
 Tuck School of Business, Dartmouth College
 McCombs School of Business, University of Texas at Austin
 The University of Chicago Booth School of Business
The championship final of the Fast Money MBA Challenge was broadcast live from outside the NASDAQ Marketsite in New York City on 2007-08-22.  In that championship final, Yale faced Texas for the $200,000 prize.  After six weeks, the $200,000 prize was won by Yale.

Worldwide simulcast

CNBC Asia
CNBC Asia broadcasts the programme on Tuesdays to Saturdays 5AM SIN/HK/TWN Time LIVE during the Daylight Saving Time period in the U.S. Without DST, CNBC Asia only broadcasts "LIVE" Friday (US time) edition of Fast Money on Saturdays morning at 6am SIN/HK/TWN time, and rerun version of Mondays to Thursdays US time editions are aired from Tuesdays to Fridays at 12pm SIN/HK/TWN time.

CNBC Europe
CNBC Europe does not generally broadcast the programme live, apart from on days when the news of the day merits extra live news programming. The channel instead airs broadcasts of CNBC documentaries and weekly magazine programmes in the timeslot. However it is shown between November and March on a four-hour tape delay to fill the one-hour gap between the end of Street Signs and the start of Capital Connection, created by Europe not being on Daylight Saving Time.

Fast Money Halftime Report
Fast Money Halftime Report is an American financial stock trading talk show that airs from noon-1 ET on CNBC.  This show, which follows the same format as the 5pm show, debuted July 7, 2010.  It spun off from a segment on Power Lunch, which itself moved to 1 ET from noon ET on July 7, 2010.  Unlike Fast Money, this halftime market show is hosted by Scott Wapner, and is broadcast live from CNBC Global Headquarters in Englewood Cliffs, New Jersey.

Originally aired as a half-hour show, the Fast Money Halftime Report doubled its runtime from 30 minutes to 60 minutes on October 17, 2011 and also moved up to the noon ET timeslot.  The newly expanded hour-long show replaced The Strategy Session, which was cancelled October 14, 2011 as a result of very low ratings.

See also
Mad Money (a CNBC financial investing program, hosted by Jim Cramer, which follows a similar format)
On the Money (2005)

References

External links
 

CNBC original programming
2006 American television series debuts
2000s American television news shows
2010s American television news shows
2020s American television news shows
2000s American television talk shows
2010s American television talk shows
2020s American television talk shows
Business-related television series
English-language television shows
Television shows filmed in New York City